Events in the year 1965 in Belgium.

Incumbents

Monarch: Baudouin
Prime Minister: Théo Lefèvre (to 28 July); Pierre Harmel (from 28 July)

Events
 31 March – Treaty to establish the Benelux Court of Justice signed.
 23 May – 1965 Belgian general election

Art and architecture

Buildings
 Victor Horta's Maison du Peuple in Brussels demolished.

Births
 10 July – Danny Boffin, footballer

Deaths

References

 
1960s in Belgium
Belgium
Years of the 20th century in Belgium
Belgium